Olga Borisovna Drozdova (born 1 April 1965, Nakhodka) is a Russian theater and film actress, director.    People's Artist of the Russian Federation (2015).

Selected filmography
 Queen Margo (1996) as Charlotte de Sauve
 Bandit Petersburg (1998) as Katya
 Popsa (2005) as crazy singer
 The First Circle (2006) as Dotnara, Volodin’s Wife
 Furious (2017) as  Princess Agrafena, Prince Yuri's wife

References

External links
 

1965 births
Living people
People from Nakhodka
Soviet actresses
People's Artists of Russia
20th-century Russian actresses
21st-century Russian actresses
Honored Artists of the Russian Federation